Anti-Bengali sentiment in India comprises negative attitudes and views on Bengalis in India. Though Bengalis have lived in different parts of India for centuries, they are subject to widespread discrimination, specially by the people from the North and North-east India. This can be either by any other community (e.g. tribal communities, Biharis, Assamese etc.) or in any particular place (see article further), due to reasons like inhabitation, discriminating sentiments, political reasons, Government actions, anti-Bangladeshi sentiment etc. The discriminative condition of Bengalis can be traced from Khoirabari massacre, Nellie massacre, Silapathar massacre, North Kamrup massacre, Goreswar massacre, Bongal Kheda etc. This has led to emergence of Bengali sub-nationalism in India as a form of protest and formation of many pro-Bengali organisations in India.

Assam

Assamese-Bengali strife

Background
According to Subir Deb, the author of Story of Bengal and the Bengalis, the anti-Bengali sentiment in Assam was deliberately fomented by the British in the colonial times. The British had made Bengali as the official language in colonially administered Assam between 1836 and 1873, which included the Bengali-majority areas of three districts (Cachar, Hailakandi and Karimganj) in the Barak Valley region, but the map of Assam was drawn by the colonialists in such way that many languages and communities (ethnic and indigenous) overlapped. This created language strife among the communities.  They introduced the infamous "Line System", which segregated Bengali settlers in Assam from its indigenous people. The line system was originated in 1920 in Nowgong district, though then this was not any colonial Government rule, it was just personal initiative of a few British district officers. By 1921 the first army corps had conquered Goalpara. During 1921-1931 the system was enforced in Nawgaon district, where the immigrants constituted 14 per cent of the population. It was also implemented in Barpeta sub-division of Kamrup and Darang. In 1937, a 9-member Line System Committee was formed by the Government. The general consensus of the committee was that "the line system was a temporary mechanism created to check the unrestricted inflow of the immigrants into open areas and to protect the demographic composition against disruption and disturbance". Though after successive Governments, line system was not abolished. The line system segregated the Bengalis from the indigenous and tribal people, creating a strife between them.

1960 language bill in Assam
On 10 October 1960, Bimala Prasad Chaliha, the then Chief Minister of Assam presented a bill in the Legislative Assembly that makes Assamese as the sole official language of the Assam.
Ranendra Mohan Das, the then MLA from Karimganj (North) assembly constituency and an ethnic Bengali, protested against the bill on the ground that it sought to impose the language of a third of the population over the rest two thirds. On 24 October, the bill was passed in the Assam legislative assembly thereby making Assamese as the one and only official language of the state. The law forcefully imposed Assamese 
on Bengalis in terms of employment, education and others. This resulted massive protests from the Barak Valley. After movement, when Government agreed to take Bengali as an additional official language, this made the Assamese fierce and not keen to share their official language. This resulted in insurgency against Bengalis in Assam and numerous massacres.

Massacres and attacks on Bengalis

Bongal Kheda (1960 onwards)
In 1960, Assamese demanded to purge out Bengalis from Assam. Frequent attacks on the Bengali Hindus started in June 1960. Starting in Cotton College in Guwahati and then spread to the rest of the state. Assamese mob attacked innocent Bengali Hindu settlements in the Brahmaputra Valley. The District Magistrate of Guwahati who happened to be a Bengali Hindu was attacked by a mob of around 100 people inside his residence and stabbed. The Deputy Inspector General of Police, also a Bengali Hindu was also stabbed. The Bengali students of Guwahati University, Dibrugarh Medical College and Assam Medical College were forcibly expelled from the institutions. In Dibrugarh, the Bengali Hindus were attacked in the mixed localities. Bengali Hindu houses were looted, burnt and the occupants were beaten up, knifed and driven out. 500,000 Bengalis were displaced from Assam and taken to West Bengal.

Goreswar massacre (1960)
Goreswar massacre was a planned attack on the Bengali Hindus living in Goreswar, in the Kamrup district (now Baksa district). As per a secret meeting in July 1960, at a school in Sibsagar, by a Teachers' Association, the next day a students' strike was organised at Sibsagar and groups of students and youths were sent to Jorhat, Dibrugarh and other adjoining areas to communicate the decision of the meeting. In the Brahmaputra Valley, Assamese mobs started attacking Bengalis. On July 14, 1960, riots began in Sibsagar with the looting of Bengali shops and assaults on several Bengalis. In lower Assam  (Kamrup, Nowgong and Goalpara), intense violence occurred in 25 villages in Goreswar. An Assamese mob of 15,000, armed with guns and other weapons, attacked Bengali shops and houses, destroyed 4,019 huts and 58 houses. According to the inquiry commission, at least nine Bengalis were killed, one woman was attacked and raped and nearly 1,000 Bengali Hindus fled from the area during the riot. The violence continued for months. Between July and September 1960, nearly 50,000 Bengali Hindus fled to West Bengal.

North Kamrup violence (1980)
In some districts of lower Assam, Kamrupi Bengali Hindus were often harassed as foreigners and became the target of violence. Kamrupi Bengalsi were attacked frequently. On 3 January 1980, a group of students of Baganpara High School were visiting Barikadanga to supervise a three-day strike in response to a call given by the AASU for supporting the anti-Bengali movement. In 1981, the Assamese killed nearly 100 Kamrupi Bengali Hindus. Also along with Assamese locals, Kamrupi Muslims attacked the Bengali Hindus and spread violence.

Khoirabari massacre (1983)
After the Partition of India, Bengali Hindus from India and Bengali Hindu refugees from East Bengal settled in Khoirabari in the Mangaldoi sub-division of the Darrang district. During the assembly election on 14 February 1983, the activists of the Assam Agitation blocked and had cut communications to the Bengali enclaves. Indigenous Assamese groups, who had held resentments toward the immigrant Bengalis, took advantage of the resulting isolation and surrounded and attacked the Bengali villages at night. As result, the Central Reserve Police Force and the polling agents could not be sent to Khoirabari. The immigrant Bengali Hindus had taken shelter at the Khoirabari School, where the indigenous Assamese mob attacked them. According to Indian Police Service officer E.M. Rammohun, more than 100 immigrant Bengali Hindus refugees were killed in the massacre. According to journalist Shekhar Gupta, more than 500 immigrant Bengali Hindus were killed. The survivors took shelter in the Khoirabari railway station

Silapathar massacre (1983)
In Silapathar, undivided Lakhimpur district, Assam, Bengali Hindus had been two-decades-old residents. They were an ethnic minority in the region. In February 1983, some Assamese mobs attacked the Bengali villagers with machetes, bows and arrows. They destroyed several bridges which connects remote area. The attackers burnt the houses, belongings and the food grains. The villagers ran towards the jungle for shelter. They spent days after days without much food or shelter. Veteran journalist Sabita Goswami claimed that according to Government sources, more than 1000 people were killed in the clashes. According to eyewitnesses, the attacks snatched the babies from their mother's arms and threw them on fire. The survivors fled to Arunachal Pradesh.

Nellie massacre (1983)
In the assembly elections of 1983, Indira Gandhi gave rights to 4 million immigrants from Bangladesh to vote. After the decision, the All Assam Students Union made a pogrom and on 18 February 1983 attacked Bengalis in 14 villages—Alisingha, Khulapathar, Basundhari, Bugduba Beel, Bugduba Habi, Borjola, Butuni, Dongabori, Indurmari, Mati Parbat, Muladhari, Mati Parbat no. 8, Silbheta, Borburi and Nellie of Nagaon district.  The massacre claimed the lives of 2,191 people while even unofficial figures run at more than 10,000. 
Though this mass killings happened, not a single person was given  punishment as a part of the 1985 Assam Accord.

Other instances during Assamese language movement and Assam movement
In 1972, during the Assamese language movement, Bengali were mostly targeted. In Gauhati University, Bengali Hindus were attacked. Around 14,000 Bengali Hindus fled to West Bengal and elsewhere in the North East.

The 1979 agitation witnessed frequent curfews and strikes called by the All Assam Students Union (AASU) and other local organisations. Trains have been attacked. Central Government employees of the Oil and Natural Gas Commission, Indian Airlines and the Railways have been intimidated and asked to leave the state. Assamese threw stones in Bengali-dominated neighbourhood Das Colony in Maligaon area. A petrol pump on the main road between Maligaon and Guwahati, was set on fire. At least two young Bengali men in Maligaon were murdered. One incident that happened where a young Assamese man, a school dropout in his early 20s, who used to reside in Maligaon locality. He stabbed his own childhood Bengali friend, who had just joined the Indian Air Force, to death in the middle of the street. Bengali settlements were attacked throughout the Brahmaputra Valley. Rabi Mitra, an ethnic Bengali technical officer at Oil India's headquarters in Duliajan was brutally murdered by Assamese. In 1980, a Bengali legislator was killed and the Bengali localities came under systematic attack repeatedly. In 1983, the Bengali Hindus were attacked numerous times during the anti-foreign agitation. In Dhemaji district, the Bengali houses were vandalised. Tribals attacked government-sanctioned Bengali Hindu refugee settlements in the Lakhimpur district. Bengali babies were snatched from their mothers and thrown to fire, alive resulting in horrendous massacres. Numerous extremely abusive graffiti targeting Bengali Hindus became a common hate spreading mechanism for the Assamese rioters like "If you see a snake and a Bengali, kill the Bengali first", they stated former West Bengal chief minister Jyoti Basu as the "Bustard son of Bengal". Effigies of then West Bengal Chief Minister, Jyoti Basu, 
hung from light posts and trees.

2000 onwards
On 1 November 2018, five Bengali Hindus were killed on the banks of Brahmaputra near Kherbari village in Tinsukia district of Assam. United Liberation Front of Asom were suspected for the massacre.

In 2021, two Bengali Muslims were killed during an eviction drive by the Government of Assam.

In today's Assam
Bengali Hindus living in Assam are routinely called 'Bangladeshis' and harassed. Bengali Hindus are being targeted by Assamese nationalist organizations and political parties from time to time. They are discriminatively tagged as Bongal (outsider Bengalis) in context of linguistic politics of Assam. Many Bengalis are given "D Voter" status and taken to the detention camps. There are nearly 899 people (as of June 2018) who are in six detention centres across Assam. According to government figures, nearly 90,000 people including mostly Bengalis, were declared as foreigners between 1985 and 2016. AIUDF alleges that many of the so-called declared foreigners did not even receive notice from the court and identifying undocumented immigrants or "D voters" are done "arbitrary", "random" and without proper investigation from the Government. Many of them have been in detention camps without any faults. 
Some examples of the discriminative incidents include:
Morjina Bibi, from Fofanga Part I village in Assam's Goalpara district, had spent nearly nine months in detention from December 2016 to July 2017, for a case of mistaken identity which was a Government fault. 
Gopal Das, 65, committed suicide after receiving a notice from the Foreigners Tribunal in Udalguri district in spite of having his name in the 1966 voters list. 
Sajahan Kazi, a government school teacher from Barpeta district, took 20 years for him to prove his citizenship from 1997. Even, Ajmal Haque, who served in the Indian army for 30 years, was asked to prove his citizenship. 
Moinal Mollah of Barpeta district's Bohri village was kept in Goalpara detention camp, despite his parents and grandparents declared as Indian citizens with the necessary documents. After three years an NGO, MY-FACTS, provided free legal assistance to Mollah and Supreme Court ordered his release.

Aman Wadud, who practices at the Guwahati High Court, says for proving their Citizenship status, they sell their home and lands to pay legal fees, which may go up to 50,000 rupees ($734).

On 31 August 2019, the names of more than 13 lakh Bengalis were removed from the final list of N. R. C. based on 1971 while many of them had claimed to have documents of their citizenship and submitted to the Assam Government.

Also the Barak valley is the most neglected part of Assam in terms of its infrastructure development, tourism sector, educational institutions, hospitals, IT industries, G.D.P, H.D.I etc. which is still lagging behind in comparison to the Assam's mainland Brahmaputra valley, which have access to all of those facilities mentioned above. No representatives from Barak Valley are called for Government meetings. Threateners against Bengalis are not arrested by the Police. Promises are not fulfilled many times separately only for Barak Valley areas like Vistadome train services were started but promises to run the service to Badarpur is ignored.
Two Bengali Hindus were killed by militant formation HNLC, but the killings neither drew any political or Governmental attraction nor the miscreants are arrested.

Bihar
In first half of the 20th century, Bihar has a large number of middle class Bengalis with educational, medical and legal professions from Madhubani, Ghatshila, Purnia, Mithila, Darbhanga and Bhagalpur. During the 15 years of RJD rule and Congress rule of 80s, Bengali families faced several cases of house-grabbing. There were many prominent, have also been forcibly occupied by Biharis, making the Bengali community selling their home and migrate to other places. This made Bengalis, who were pioneers in setting up higher education in Bihar, having an identity crisis in Bihar.

During 1948 Bengali speaking peoples of Manbhum district imposed Hindi language forcibly giving restrictions in Bengali language, and after that making Hindi the sole official language of Bihar resulted in massive protests.

Meghalaya

Khasi-Bengali strife
The 1979 Khasi Bengali riot was first major riot in Shillong, which was directed against the local Bengalis and the minority. While after the formation of Assam, most of the Assamese left but Indian Bengalis, who dominated middle class jobs, and Bengali refugees from East Bengal stayed there. Assam's Bongal Kheda has influenced Meghalaya to drive its Bengalis and other minorities out of the state. The Khasi Students Union (KSU), was created on March 20, 1978, for the filling the same. On October 22, 1979, a fight between Khasis and Bengalis took place over a Khasi man, who allegedly crossed over the idol, damaging the Kali idol of idol of Lal Villa which was taken out for immersion. Afterwards, Bengali houses over the whole locality of Laitumukhra in Shillong were burnt down by the Khasi tribes. The riots escalated strife between the communities which continued in the 1980s and 1990s also. Bengali houses burnt and people were murdered and raped. Nearly 20,000 Bengalis were displaced from the state in 1979, mainly from the capital Shillong following anti Bengali riot. In 1987 there were curfews for a whole year. A separatist militant outfit Hynniewtrep National Liberation Council (HNLC) (a terrorist organisation designated by Government of India) was created which resulted in several riots in 1992. Most of the Bengalis moved to West Bengal or the Barak Valley of Assam or became internal refugees in Assam.

After 2000
From 2008, the situation was relatively peaceful in Shillong which attracted tourists from all over. Though in 2006 to 2017, the HNLC members increased from 4 lakh to more than a million.

In February 2020, the HNLC warned all Bengali Hindus to leave the Ichamati and Majai areas of the district within one month. In a statement, HNLC general secretary Sainkumar Nongtraw warned of “mass bloodshed” if the Bengali Hindus did not leave Meghalaya. Incidents were reported where tribal miscreants tried to damage vehicles. After two days, more than a dozen non-tribals including Bengalis were assaulted by a group of masked tribal assailants in different parts of the Khasi Hills in which ten men were stabbed in Shillong. Members of the students union tried to burn down a house which led to retaliation from the local non-tribals.

Khasi Students’ Union (KSU), an influential students’ body in Meghalaya, put up banners and posters, saying “All Meghalaya Bengalis are Bangladeshis”.

Tripura

Tripuri-Bengali strife
As per the Tripura Rajmala's royal chronicle of the state's Manikya monarchs and census reports, in 1947, 93 per cent of princely state Tripura's population was of the tribals. According to Nagarik Suraksha Mancha, the tribals came from Mongolia, Tripuri and other parts of the world. After the partition of India, Hindus from neighbouring Comilla, Noakhali and Chittagong districts of then East Pakistan, from Dacca district, across the river Meghna, fled into Tripura, the majority of them being Bengali. They triggered a population explosion from 646,000 in 1951 to 1.15 million in 1961 and 1.5 million in 1971. This resulted in the Tripuri population shrinking to 28.5 percent. In 1977, a section of the Tripuris formed a political party Tripura Upajati Juba Samiti (TUJS). TUJS-backed Tripura National Volunteers (TNV), under the leadership of B. K. Hrangkhawl gone underground. There were other extremist organisations called "Sangkrak Army" led by Sanglei. Sangkrak tied up with the outlawed Mizo National Front (MNF) to deal sophisticated arms. Their motive was to drive out "foreigners" i.e. Bengalis out of the state. As Left Front was the ruling government for decades and showed no sign of dividing the state, the extremist organisations are against them. Tripura Upajati Juba Samiti (Tujs) and its party organ, Chinikok, were against the Bengalis and against the Left Front in particular. Tujs leaders demanded 1949 as the cut-off year and drew up an action programme in 1980s.

Massacres and attacks on Bengalis

Mandai massacre (1980)
Mandwi, an obscure village located about 60 km north east of Agartala, is inhabited by Tripuri mostly and the minor Bengali people. On the night of 6 June, armed Tripuri tribal insurgent groups began to block the nontribal localities and arson, violence and murder. Thousands of Bengalis took shelter near the National Highway 44. The BDO of Jirania and Shankar Narayan, the District Magistrate of West Tripurahad arranged a relief camp at Khayerpur School and started administering initial relief to the Bengali refugees. 
From the afternoon of 7 June, the situation worsened. In the evening there were reports of large-scale arson and looting in Jirania block. The rioters were committing arson on the Bengali villages in Champaknagar and the foothills of Baramura. On 8 June, Satyendra Chakraborty, the LAMPS manager of Mandwi and Sachindra Saha, a CPI(M) leader reported at the B.D.O. office that more than 500 Bengalis in Mandwi have been blocked and are to be killed by the armed Tripuris. Many Bengalis had taken shelter at the police outpost in Mandwi, which remained unmanned. An entire village was fired in Purba Noabadi. In Mandwi all the houses and huts were destroyed to ashes, except the LAMPS building. The entire place was full of blood. Around 350-400 Bengalis were killed. After two hours, the injured were sent to GB hospital in a truck. Those who survived were given shelter across different schools of agartala. . According to Major R. Rajamani, the commander of the Indian army contingent that arrived on 9 June, that the My Lai massacre was not even half as gruesome as in Mandai.

Bagber massacre (2000)
Bagber is a village under the Kalyanpur police station in West Tripura district of Tripura. In May 2000, during the ongoing ethnic riots scores of Bengali Hindus had taken shelter at a refugee camp in Bagber. On 20 May, a heavily armed group of around 60 NLFT militants raided the Bagber village. The refugees who had taken shelter adjacent to the Niranjan Sardarpara School, began to flee towards Kanchanpur. The militants then targeted the inmates at the refugee camp, where they killed around 20 and injured several others. The CRPF personnel deployed at Bagber didn't protest when the massacre took place. Six of them succumbed to their injuries later making a death toll of 25.

2020 Bru-resettlement
The centre, State governments of Tripura and Mizoram, and representatives of Bru organisations signed an agreement on January 16, 2019, in the presence of Union Home Minister Amit Shah to allow nearly 35,000 Bru tribal people, who were displaced from Mizoram and are living in Tripura as refugees since 1997 in six relief camps, to settle permanently in Tripura. The Tripura government selected 12 places including Kanchanpur. This resulted conflicts between the Brus and the local Bengali non-tribal people who used to live there for decades. On December 10, 2019, about 150 “miscreants” who are accused to be Brus, ransacked and looted the shops and houses of 93 Bengali families. These families were temporarily taken to the barracks, official quarters, and the second floor of the Anandabazar police station.
Protests took place against the settlement and the state government used violence in despersing the mobs. Over 6,000 people were thrown out of their homes by Bru migrants. After December 10 violence, Nagarik Suraksha Mancha, was formed for the protection of Bengalis. More protests and strikes took out from Bangla Pokkho, Unnayan Mancha, Bangalee Oikya Mancha, Joint Movement Committee (JMC) etc. On the 6th day, 21 November 2020, 1 Bengali was killed, more than 20 were injured in Police open fire.

Rest of India

With increasing Hindi speaking population, Bengalis are dominated to speak in Hindi and not in Bengali. Two Bengali women in Burra Bazar, West Bengal were lynched and harassed by non-Bengali, because of talking in Bengali. They were termed as "Bangladeshis" and were attacked by them.
Bengali-speaking daily wage workers in Bengalore are accusing the police and Government for harassing them for identification, even sometimes forcing many to leave jobs. At Thubarahalli in the eastern outskirts of Bengaluru, around 12,000 Bengali-speaking people in the city live and are in unrest and fear. They allege that police are demanding a long list of documents branding them as 'Bangladeshis', and many have been forced into hiding, skipping work for fear and leaving jobs.

Anti-Bengali and accused to be anti-Bengali organisations

Militant anti-Bengali organisations (declared) in North-East India
Hynniewtrep National Liberation Council, Meghalaya (banned, designated as a terrorist organisation by Government of India)
United Liberation Front of Asom, Assam (banned, designated as a terrorist organisation by Government of India)
Khasi Students' Union, Meghalaya 
National Liberation Front of Tripura, Tripura  (banned, designated as a terrorist organisation by Government of India)
All Tripura Tiger Force, Tripura (merged and defunct)

Accused political parties

BJP
The "Bharatiya Janata Party" (BJP) is largely accused (or considered in some cases) to be anti-Bengali due to its non-Bengali culture and anti-Bengali demands and controversial anti-Bengali comments.
 
According to Nobel laureate Amartya Sen, BJP defines Bengalis as narrowly mindset and does aggressive politics of parochialism which is against the quintessential Bengali pluralism. 
West Bengal chief minister Mamata Banerjee accused, "They (BJP) brought miscreants on hire from Uttar Pradesh, Bihar, Rajasthan and Jharkhand, specifically to go on the rampage here and destroy heritage in Bengal". 
BJP MP John Barla demanded partition of Bengal to create a separate state or union territory for North, which is directly against the Bengali integrity and was not even supported by ethnic groups in North Bengal.
On May 20, 2019, during a membership drive of BJP in West Bengal, while involving in violence with TMC, BJP supporters broke a 200-year old iconic bust of Iswar Chandra Vidyasagar in Vidyasagar College. According to S. R. Mohanty, the college hostel caretaker, Around 50-60 people, from the rally, started pushing at the gate, trying to open it forcefully. They pelted stones and threw water bottles inside the campus. In a video footage, some men wearing saffron shirts written “NaMo Again” and at least one sporting a saffron turban, with chanting 'Joi Shree Ram' slogan were seen vandalising a bust of cultural icon Ishwarchandra Vidyasagar. Students narrated this as an "act of terror" by the BJP. Breaking the bust of Iswar Chandra Vidyasagar, who was one of 19th century prisoners of changing the society, was "shameful incident" as said by students. Also the Quint media and Scroll media examined the case respectively and both examination reveals most of the BJP's claims were false and even they created false Facebook and Twitter accounts disguised as students of Vidyasagar College to dislodge the incident.
Bengaluru South MP Tejasvi Surya demanded NRC in Karnataka. In the name of wiping out illegal Bangladeshi migrants in Bengaluru or due to the inability to distinguish between Bengalis and Bangladeshis, the Bengalis in Bengaluru are being harassed by BJP-lead Government.
In Tripura, the BJP-lead Central Government has agreed to the Bru-resettlement where more than 3000 Bengalis lost their lands. Also, Tripura chief minister from BJP, Biplab Kumar Deb says, non-Hindi speakers do not love their country.

TIPRA Motha
The Nagarik Suraksha Mancha, a jointly formed organisation for Bengalis has accused and blamed TIPRA Motha (The Indigenous Progressive Regional Alliance) for the plight of Bengalis in Tripura. Pradyot Manikya Debbarma, the former State Congress president and scion of the Tripura royal family, who leads the alliance, has signed to the agreement for resettling the Brus in the State, which resulted in violence over Bengalis in Tripura. According to the Mancha, Debbarma's political ambition was to undo the deeds of his grandmother, Queen Kanchan Prava Devi, who made Swasti Samabay Samiti and donated 1,000 drune of land for the Bengali Hindu victims of Partition. 
On 9 February 2021, an FIR was lodged against Debbarma and TIPRA for allegedly spreading anti-Bengali sentiment to the people.

All Assam Students' Union 
All Assam Students' Union,a students' organisation in Assam, whose main agenda was anti-Bangladeshi sentiment and Assam movement. Due to inability to differentiate Indian Bengalis and Bangladeshi migrants, the anti-Bangladeshi sentiment morphed into anti-Bengali prejudice. They raised slogans like "Get out Bengalis", "If you see a snake and a Bengali, kill the Bengali first", "Bengalis are dog". They stated former West Bengal chief minister Jyoti Basu as the "Bustard son of Bengal".

Protests against anti-Bengali sentiment

Many organisations were founded to protest ongoing discrimination and anti-Bengali sentiment.

Bengali language movement in Assam

80 percent of Assam's Barak Valley are Bengali and speaks Bangla language. On 24 October, a bill was passed in the Assam legislative assembly making Assamese as the sole official language of the state. On 5 February 1961, the Cachar Gana Sangram Parishad was formed to protest against the imposition of Assamese in the Bengali-speaking Barak Valley. Rathindranath Sen was chief person of the organisation. People soon started protesting in Silchar, Karimganj and Hailakandi. On 24 April, the Parishad flagged off a fortnight-long padayatra in the Barak Valley to raise awareness among the masses, which ended after 200 miles reaching to Silchar on 2 May. 
On 18 May, the Assam police arrested three prominent leaders of the movement, namely Nalinikanta Das, Rathindranath Sen and Bidhubhushan Chowdhury, the editor of weekly Yugashakti. On 19 May, the dawn to dusk hartal started. Picketing started in the sub-divisional towns of Silchar, Karimganj and Hailakandi. A Bedford truck carrying nine arrested activists from Katigorah was fired and the truck driver and the policemen escorting the arrested fled the spot. Soon after that the paramilitary forces, guarding the railway station, started beating the protesters with rifle butts and batons without any provocation from them. They fired 17 rounds into the crowd. Twelve persons received bullet wounds and were carried to hospitals. Nine of them died that day. Two more persons died later. One person, Krishna Kanta Biswas survived for another 24 hours with a bullet wound in chest. Ullaskar Dutta send nine bouquets for nine martyrs. 
On 20 May, the people of Silchar took out a procession with the bodies of the martyrs in protest of the killings. After the incident and more protests, the Assam government had to withdraw the circular and Bengali was ultimately given official status in the three districts of Barak Valley.

Organisations protesting against anti-Bengali sentiment

Militant
United Bengali Liberation Front: United Bengali Liberation Front (UNLF), designed as a militant group was created to protect Indian Bengalis against Tripuri militants and other tribal groups. The UBLF came into existence in 1995 after the ATTF was formed with the aim of decimating Bengali Hindus living in Tripura. UBLF was involved in bomb blasts, murders and Hostage Crises in a response to the same attacks on Bengalis by ATTF or NLFT. 
The UBLF, though not a proscribed outfit under the Prevention of Terrorism Act, 2002, but has been banned by the State government for its involvement in the activities of separatist killings and murders.
United Bangal Liberation Army: United Bangal Liberation Army (UBLA) is a Bengali outfit that claims to stand upright for the Bengalis. They strongly condemned atrocities and discrimination against the Bangali People in Meghaloya by the Khasi Students Union Organization since 1979. The group is against Gorkhaland demand in West Bengal and warns the Khasi People to send back to Cambodia. They released an ultimatum not to do anti-Bengali works to ignore serious consequences. The militant fraction of the group is termed as BangaSena.

Political
 Amra Bangalee: During 1981, amid anti-Bengali violences in  Northeast India, Amra Bangalee sparked off protesting. The socio-political party is based on Prabhat Ranjan Sarkar's Progressive Utilization Theory. The party's primary motto was to stop Bengali eviction in Assam and North East. They won some gram panchayat seats in the elections. In 1980s it entered the Tripura Legislative Assembly. Amra Bangalee also demands a separate state as a homeland for Bengalis, where Bengali language should be used in all official and non-official works.
 Lok Sewak Sangh was formed during the Manbhum Bengali language movement to promote use of Bengali language in Bengali-dominated areas in southern Bihar state. They labelled the imposition of Hindi language as 'linguistic imperialism'. After breaking with the Indian National Congress its elected officials resigned and were re-elected on LSS tickets. Afterwards most of the cadres migrated to Communist Party of India (Marxist).

Apolitical/Social
Nagarik Suraksha Mancha:
Nagarik Suraksha Mancha, was formed during the 2020 Bru-resettlement in Tripura, while Bengali lands were given to the Bru tribals. Regarding the December 10 violence by Police over the Bengalis the organisation was formed. The organisation stated that the government a 11-points demand, which includes repatriating Bru migrants to Mizoram, compensation for those affected by violence during anti-CAB protests and others. They accused the Tribals as "foreigners" who came from Mongolia, China and other parts of the world and the Brus as "outsiders". They placed strikes and protests against the Government to secure land for Bengalis. They also accused Pradyot Manikya Debbarma, scion of the Tripura royal family to be the cause of recent discrimination of Bengalis and anti-Bengali sentiment in Tripura.

Bangla Pokkho:

Bangla Pokkho was founded in 2019 to protest Hindi & Urdu linguistic and cultural imposition by Indian Statistical Institute professor Garga Chatterjee. The organisation demands 100% reservation for residents of West Bengal in fields of Government job and 90% reservation in other job sectors, education, military, administration works. Bangla Pokkho's demand resulted in starting Domicile reservation in Calcutta University  and Jadavpur University, cancelled expelling of Bengalis in WBSEDCL, allows majority Bengali players in Cricket Association of Bengal, inclusion of Bengali language in online platforms etc. 
Also they protested against the BJP lead Central/Union Government for their anti-Bengali works. They accused that the central government led by BJP is trying to decimate Bengalis by performing NRC and CAA, citing about Assam where more than 13 lakh Bengalis did not get names in the NRC list. Bangla Pokkho along with Kanchanpur Nagarik Surakkha Mancha meet in a big protest in Tripura, that gathered more than 30,000 Bengalis in Tripura, complaining against social discrimination of Bengalis and the Bru-resettlement by the Tripura state BJP Government. The organisation also protests against RSS and Hindi imperialism which is straightly anti-Bengali.

Bangla o Bangla Bhasha Bachao Committee: Bangla O Bangla Bhasa Bachao Committee (BOBBBC), is a Siliguri-based organization that protested against the Gorkhaland formation. They accused GJM for some anti-Bengali works in Darjeeling.
Jatiya Bangla Sommelan: Jatiyo Bangla Sammelan was created on 9 December 2019 as a split from Bangla Pokkho. Most of its members have formerly been part of Bangla Pokkho. Both Jatiyo Bangla Sommelon and Bangla Pokkho came into being, to counter the "imposition of Hindi" and "north Indian culture". Jatiyo Bangla Sammelan has demonstrated against the Citizenship Amendment Act in different parts of West Bengal. In 2020, Jatiyo Bangla Sammelan protested against performing Chhath puja at the two ecologically important lakes (i.e. Rabindra Sarobar and Subhas Sarobar).  Although performing rituals in these lakes was prohibited by National Green Tribunal (NGT), the West Bengal government had appealed before the NGT and moved to the Supreme Court of India to allow Chhath puja in Rabindra Sarobar, the plea was rejected. But the Supreme Court also gave the state government no relief. The organisation set up a night-long vigil at the entry points to the lake to prevent anyone from entering the premises. Thousands of devotees had entered the lake and performed puja. The personnel of Kolkata Police also, were reluctant in enforcing NGT orders and were seen standing idly outside the lake premises. They demanded that while in West Bengal, Chhat pujas are declared as holidays but the Bengali festivals were not declared as holidays in Bihar, UP and North India, describing it "Government's Non-bengali appeasement for vote bank politics". Jatiyo Bangla Sommelon has held and led various protests against "Hindi-imposition" in Kolkata and elsewhere in West Bengal. The aim of these protests was to counter the imposition of Hindi on Bengalis, the Central Government's National Education Policy and a perceived threat to the culture of west bengal.
Bhumiputra Unnayan Morcha of India: Bhumiputra Unnayan Morcha of India (BHUMI) was founded on 16 July 2020 with a vision to spread the political and social awareness among the people of Bengal as well as India to get their Constitutional Rights and Social Justice and to resist the forceful impose of any foreign language and culture, to resist further division of Bengal in West Bengal.
Others: Anandabazar Displaced People's Committee, All India Bengali Refugees Association, Unnayan Mancha, Bangalee Oikya Mancha, Tripura Joint Movement Committee, Nikhil Bharat Bangali Udbastu Samanway Samiti, Banglabhasha Bachao Samiti, Jana Jagaran Morcha etc. are some other small scale organisations protesting against anti-Bengali sentiment in India.

Protests in rest of India
When the Government of India and Government of Bihar imposed the Hindi language for Bengali speaking people living in Manbhum district of the state of Bihar, they forced the government to form a new district entering in the state of West Bengal.
After successive protests, Government of Delhi has agreed to create Bangla Academy in Delhi.

References

Sources
 
 
 

Others: Anandabazar Displaced People's Committee, All India Bengali Refugees Association, Unnayan Mancha, Bangalee Oikya Mancha, Tripura Joint Movement Committee, Nikhil Bharat Bangali Udbastu Samanway Samiti, Banglabhasha Bachao Samiti, Jana Jagaran Morcha etc. are some other small scale organisations protesting against anti-Bengali sentiment in India.

Bengal
Racism in India
Persecution of Bengali Hindus
Prejudice and discrimination by type
Orientalism